Eethen is a village in the Dutch province of North Brabant. It is located in the municipality of Altena.

The village was first mentioned in 850 as Atina. The etymology is unclear. Eethen developed on a sand hill in the Middle Ages and part of the original ring road is still visible.

The Dutch Reformed church dates from the 12th century. The tower was added in the late-14th century. In 1944, it was severely damaged by World War II and was restored and reconstructed between 1948 and 1951.

Eethen was home to 310 people 1840. Eethen was a separate municipality between 1923 and 1973. It was formed by the merging of the municipalities of Drongelen, Genderen, and Meeuwen, and became a part of Aalburg in 1973.

Gallery

References

Populated places in North Brabant
Former municipalities of North Brabant
Geography of Altena, North Brabant